Borderline is a 2008 Canadian drama film directed by Lyne Charlebois and co-written with Marie-Sissi Labrèche, based on her novels Borderline and La Brèche.

Synopsis 
The film follows Kiki, a graduate student in Montreal living with borderline personality disorder. Through flashbacks, the viewer learns of her past: an unknown father and a mentally ill mother who was later institutionalized. While she was raised by her grandmother, the effects of Kiki's family trauma show in her using physical intimacy to avoid emotional intimacy. With her grandmother being on the verge of death, Kiki tries to cope with how her actions have wrecked her relationships with friends, alongside the emptiness of her current affair with her thesis advisor. As she turns thirty, Kiki meets her most painful love: herself.

Cast
 Isabelle Blais as Kiki (20 & 30 years old)
 Jean-Hugues Anglade as Tcheky
 Angèle Coutu as Mémé
 Sylvie Drapeau as Mère de Kiki / Kiki's Mother
 Laurence Carbonneau as Kiki (10 years old)
 Pierre-Luc Brillant as Mikael Robin
 Marie-Chantal Perron as Caroline
 Antoine Bertrand as Eric
 Hubert Proulx as Antoine
 Maxime Le Flaguais as Sébastien Vandal

Production
"The striptease scene was the worst of the shoot for me, but I don't really remember it," said Isabelle Blais. "Because to dive, I had to go into an unconscious state. I didn't have to think."

Awards
Genie Award – Adapted Screenplay; Prix Jutra – Director, Best Actress (Blais), Best Supporting Actress (Coutu), Editing

References

External links
 

2008 films
2008 drama films
Borderline personality disorder in fiction
Canadian drama films
Films shot in Montreal
2000s French-language films
Quebec films
French-language Canadian films
2000s Canadian films